Bhopal Madhya Assembly constituency is one of the 230 constituencies of Madhya Pradesh. It comes under Bhopal district.
In Bhopal Madhya Vidhan Sabha all major parties including  BJP and Congress will fight election face to face. The other parties that is BSP, Samajwadi party and Aam Aadmi Party are also in the race. There are also some local political parties in the Bhopal Madhya election 2018. Vidhan Sabha Bhopal Madhya is the most difficult and important seat for the political parties to win. The main competition is in Vidhan Sabha Bhopal Madhya seat as the headquarters of Bhopal Seat.

Members of the Legislative Assembly

References
 http://elections.traceall.in/vidhan-sabha-assembly-election-results/Bhopal-Madhya-in-Madhya-Pradesh
 http://www.mapsofindia.com/parliamentaryconstituencies/madhyapradesh/bhopal.htm&sa=U&ved=0ahUKEwjYnKG6lqzTAhUBOI8KHVYMBY8QFggOMBE&usg=AFQjCNE_9FMWV6exzEuWMtWJmambOV2ssA
 https://web.archive.org/web/20181122051723/https://mpelectionresult.com/bhopal-madhya-vidhan-sabha-chunav-2018/

Assembly constituencies of Madhya Pradesh
Bhopal district